The 2013–14 Turlock Express season was the third season of the Turlock Express professional indoor soccer club. The Express, a Pacific Division team in the Professional Arena Soccer League, played their home games at Turlock Indoor Soccer in Turlock, California. The team was led by general manager Angelica Perez and head coach Art Pulido.

Season summary
The Express started the season strong with wins over Sacramento Surge and expansion Bay Area Rosal but then lost their next 7 consecutive games. A January 10 overtime victory over the Ontario Fury snapped the losing streak but with only the top three teams in each division qualifying for the playoffs, Turlock's chance of reaching the post-season were dashed. Turlock finished the season with a 5–11 record, averaging 521 fans per home game.

The Turlock Express participated in the 2013–14 United States Open Cup for Arena Soccer, losing 5–4 in their Round of 32 game against Bay Area Rosal on Friday, December 13.

Roster moves
In mid-October 2013, the Express announced that several players from last season's roster would be returning for the 2013–14 season. Forward Adrian Gutierrez, midfielders Arturo Pulido and Samuel Saldate, and defenders Martyn Arista and Jesse Horta rejoined the team. The team also announced that new goalkeepers Mitchell Watson and Javier Rosales were signed as free agents.

Schedule

Pre-season

Regular season

† Game also counts for US Open Cup, as listed in chart below.

U.S. Open Cup for Arena Soccer

References

External links
Turlock Express official website
Turlock Express at Turlock City News
Turlock Express at Turlock Journal

Turlock Express seasons
Turlock Express
Turlock Express 2013
Turlock Express 2013